The 2012 Maui Invitational Tournament was an early-season college basketball tournament played from November 9 to November 21, 2012.  It was the 29th annual holding of the Maui Invitational Tournament, which began in 1984, and part of the 2012–13 NCAA Division I men's basketball season. The Championship Round was played at the Lahaina Civic Center in Maui, Hawaii from November 19 to 21.

Illinois were the defending champions, defeating Butler in the 2012 final, 78-61.

Brackets 
* – Denotes overtime period

Opening Round
The Opening Round was played on November 9–13 at various sites around the country.

November 9
 Illinois 75 – Colgate 55 in Champaign, IL
 USC 87 – Coppin State 73 in Los Angeles, CA

November 10
 Butler 74 – Elon 59 in Indianapolis, IN

November 11
 Marquette 84 – Colgate 63 in Milwaukee, WI
 North Carolina 80 – Florida Atlantic 56 in Chapel Hill, NC

November 12
 Texas 69 – Coppin State 46 in Austin, TX

November 13
 Mississippi State 78 – Florida Atlantic 58 in Starkville, MS

Regional Round

*Games played at Alumni Gym in Elon, NC

Championship Round
The Championship Round occurred from November 19–21 at Lahaina Civic Center in Maui, Hawaii.

References

Maui
Maui Invitational
Maui